Zebra is the eighth studio album by the electronica Swiss band Yello. The record was released on 17 October 1994 through 4th & B'way and Mercury labels.

Track listing

CD edition
All songs by Blank/Meier.
"Suite 909" – 6:16
"How How" – 2:39
"Night Train" – 3:36
"Do It" – 3:08
"I … I'm in Love" – 3:28
"S.A.X." – 3:12
"Fat Cry" – 4:11
"Tremendous Pain" – 3:58
"Move Dance Be Born" – 6:03
"The Premix" – 5:54
"Poom Shanka" – 3:28

Vinyl edition
All songs by Blank/Meier.

Side 1
"Suite 909" – 6:16
"How How" – 2:39
"Night Train" – 3:36
"I … I'm in Love" – 3:28
"S.A.X." – 3:12
"Fat Cry" – 4:11
Side 2
"Tremendous Pain" – 3:58
"Do It" – 3:08
"Move Dance Be Born" – 6:03
"The Premix" – 5:54
"Poom Shanka" – 3:28

Personnel
Yello 
Boris Blank – background vocals, arranger, engineer
Dieter Meier – lyricist, vocals
with:
Ian Shaw – background vocals
Marco Colombo – guitar
Rene Chico Hablas – guitar
Kevin Metcalfe – mastering
LWS – illustrations

Charts

Certifications

References

1994 albums
Yello albums
Mercury Records albums
4th & B'way Records albums